The 2004–2005 San Miguel Beermen season was the 30th season of the franchise in the Philippine Basketball Association (PBA).

Transactions

Championship
The San Miguel Beermen won their 17th PBA title and their first championship in four years during the 2005 PBA Fiesta Conference, defeating Talk 'N Text Phone Pals, four games to one. The Beermen last won a crown in the 2001 All-Filipino Cup.

Roster

Philippine Cup

Game log

|- bgcolor="#edbebf"
| 1
| October 3
| Talk 'N Text
| 89–93
| Hontiveros (17) Gahol (17)
| 
| 
| Araneta Coliseum
| 0–1
|- bgcolor="#bbffbb"
| 2
| October 7
| Sta.Lucia
| 79–73
| 
| 
| 
| Zamboanga City
| 1–1
|- bgcolor="#bbffbb" 
| 3
| October 13
| Brgy.Ginebra
| 83–72
| Hontiveros (18)
| 
| 
| Araneta Coliseum
| 2–1
|- bgcolor="#edbebf" 
| 4
| October 17
| Coca Cola
| 84–92
| Belasco (22)
| 
| 
| Araneta Coliseum
| 2–2
|- bgcolor="#edbebf" 
| 5
| October 20
| Air21
| 67–70
| 
| 
| 
| Araneta Coliseum
| 2–3
|- bgcolor="#bbffbb" 
| 6
| October 24
| Alaska
| 75–67 
| Hontiveros (17)
| 
| 
| Araneta Coliseum
| 3–3
|- bgcolor="#bbffbb" 
| 7
| October 29
| Red Bull
| 93–82
| 
| 
| 
| Araneta Coliseum
| 4–3

|- bgcolor="#edbebf" 
| 13
| December 1
| FedEx
| 90–106
| Seigle (21)
| 
| 
| Araneta Coliseum
| 6–7
|- bgcolor="#bbffbb"
| 14
| December 8
| Purefoods
| 93–86 
| Belasco (28)
| 
| 
| Philsports Arena
| 7–7
|- bgcolor="#edbebf" 
| 15
| December 10
| Talk 'N Text
| 82–97
| Seigle (18)
| 
| 
| Araneta Coliseum
| 7–8
|- bgcolor="#bbffbb" 
| 16
| December 16
| Coca Cola
| 80–75
| Belasco (30)
| 
| 
| Dagupan
| 8–8
|- bgcolor="#edbebf" 
| 17
| December 21
| Brgy.Ginebra
| 
| 
| 
| 
| Laoag City
| 8–9
|- bgcolor="#bbffbb"
| 18
| December 25
| Red Bull
| 92–78
| Belasco (27)
| 
| 
| Cuneta Astrodome
| 9–9

Recruited imports

GP – Games played

References

San
San Miguel Beermen seasons